Mamadapur may refer to:

India

Karnataka
 Mamadapur, Belgaum, a village in Gokak taluka, Belgaum district
 Mamadapur, Bijapur, a village in Bijapur taluka, Bijapur district
 Mamadapur, Haveri, a village in Shiggaon taluka, Haveri district

 Mamadapur (KL), a village in Chikodi taluka, Belgaum district

Maharashtra

 Mamadapur, Latur, a village in Latur taluka, Latur district